Morro do Chapéu is a municipality in the Brazilian state of Bahia, 386 km northwest of its capital, Salvador, 1012 meters above the sea level, because of which it is one of the coolest towns in Bahia, with temperatures occasionally falling below 10 °C in the winter.  Its estimated population in 2020 is 35,440.

Overview
The municipality contains the  Morro do Chapéu State Park, created in 1998.
Standing at Chapada Diamantina region, its main attractions are Ferro Doido  waterfall and Brejões cave, both among the most beautiful natural monuments in Bahia, but are almost unexplored by tourists given to the city's lack of infrastructure. There are several other waterfalls and caves around the town.

References

Municipalities in Bahia